Satsivi (also known as chicken in walnut sauce) is a Georgian dish made from poultry such as turkey or chicken put into walnut sauce. The term satsivi is also used as a generic name for a variety of poultry made with the walnut sauce.

Bazhe

Bazhe (baže) is the most versatile of the Georgian walnut sauces, being more runny than satsivi sauce and containing either red wine vinegar or pomegranate juice. It is often used to dress boiled or fried fish, such as trout. As is typical of the Georgian palate, this sauce is slightly tart, as sweeteners are not usually used by Georgians in their cooking.

Satsivi
Satsivi is a Georgian dish made with walnut sauce and served cold, either as a dipping sauce for boiled or fried turkey or chicken. Traditionally, satsivi is made of walnuts, water, garlic, a combination of dried herbs, vinegar, cayenne pepper, and salt to taste. In this way, satsivi in the Caucasus is similar to the nut- or legume-based paste sauces to the south such as the hummus (which often contains garlic, lemon juice as a souring agent, and tahini, or sesame butter/paste) varieties found in Syrian, Lebanese, or generically Levantine cuisine.

Boiled turkey or chicken pieces submerged in satsivi is a staple of winter holiday feasts. The dish as a whole is usually also referred to as satsivi. There are also vegetarian varieties of this dish made with eggplants or cauliflower.

A similar dish of boiled chicken with walnut paste is known as Circassian chicken in Turkish, Levantine, and Egyptian cuisine, as well as "Aquz" in the Caspian cuisine of Northern Iran.

See also
Nigvziani badrijani
 List of sauces

References

Georgian words and phrases
Food ingredients
Condiments
Cuisine of Georgia (country)
Soviet cuisine
Sauces
Walnut dishes
Food paste